Lawrence Kornfeld (born 1930) is an American theater director known for his off-off-Broadway and underground theater performances in New York City. He was an artistic director of The Living Theater in the late 1950s and a founder of the Judson Poets Theater. He taught at SUNY Purchase and the Yale School of Drama. His request for a composition from Al Carmines in 1962 launched the latter's compositional career in experimental theater.

Personal life 

He was married to the psychotherapist Margaret Kornfeld (1936-2023), with whom he has a daughter.

References

Further reading 

 

Year of birth missing (living people)
Living people
American theatre directors